Stefano Bensi (born 11 August 1988) is a Luxembourger international footballer who plays club football for Fola Esch, as a striker.

Personal life
Bensi was born in Luxembourg to an Italian father and a Luxembourgish mother.

International career

International goals
Scores and results list Luxembourg's goal tally first.

References

External links

1988 births
Living people
Luxembourgian footballers
Luxembourg international footballers
Luxembourgian people of Italian descent
US Rumelange players
K.M.S.K. Deinze players
F91 Dudelange players
CS Fola Esch players
Luxembourgian expatriate footballers
Luxembourgian expatriate sportspeople in Belgium
Expatriate footballers in Belgium
Association football forwards